Spectamen geruloides is a species of sea snail, a marine gastropod mollusc in the family Solariellidae.

Description
The size of the shell attains 8 mm.

Distribution
This marine species occurs off KwaZuluNatal to Northeast Transkei, Rep. South Africa

References

External links
 To World Register of Marine Species

geruloides
Gastropods described in 1987